Midway is an unincorporated community in Giles County, Virginia. It lies at an elevation of 1,719 feet (524 m).

References

Unincorporated communities in Giles County, Virginia
Unincorporated communities in Virginia